is a Japanese former mixed martial artist and professional wrestler who currently competes for DDT Pro-Wrestling, where he was a Independent World Junior Heavyweight champion. He competed in the Flyweight, Bantamweight and Featherweight divisions. Katsumura is credited in popularizing the "Ninja Choke" submission and is the current owner of ZST.

Personal life
After graduating from university, he worked as an employee at a child care facility in Kamakura while continuing his martial arts training. This is where his nickname "Real Tiger Mask" comes from.

Mixed martial arts record

|-
| Loss
| align=center| 11-9-3
| Koetsu Okazaki
| TKO (Punches)
| Shooto: Shooto Tradition 2011
| 
| align=center| 2
| align=center| 2:24
| Tokyo, Japan
| 
|-
| Loss
| align=center| 11-8-3
| Darren Uyenoyama
| TKO (Punches)
| Shooto: The Way of Shooto 5: Like a Tiger, Like a Dragon
| 
| align=center| 2
| align=center| 3:53
| Tokyo, Japan
| 
|-
| Win
| align=center| 11-7-3
| Masakatsu Ueda
| Submission (Ninja Choke)
| Shooto: The Way of Shooto 2: Like a Tiger, Like a Dragon
| 
| align=center| 2
| align=center| 3:39
| Tokyo, Japan
| 
|-
| Win
| align=center| 10-7-3
| So Tazawa
| Submission (D'Arce Choke)
| Shooto: Revolutionary Exchanges 3
| 
| align=center| 1
| align=center| 3:54
| Tokyo, Japan
| 
|-
| Win
| align=center| 9-7-3
| Hiroyuki Yamashiro
| Submission (Twister)
| Zst: Zst 20
| 
| align=center| 1
| align=center| 2:56
| Tokyo, Japan
| 
|-
| Loss
| align=center| 8-7-3
| Alexandre Franca Nogueira
| KO (Punch)
| K-1 HERO's: Middleweight Tournament Opening Round
| 
| align=center| 2
| align=center| 1:55
| Yokohama, Japan
| 
|-
| Loss
| align=center| 8-6-3
| Katsuhiko Nagata
| TKO (Punches)
| K-1: Premium 2006 Dynamite!!
| 
| align=center| 1
| align=center| 4:12
| Osaka, Japan
| 
|-
| Draw
| align=center| 8-5-3
| Kentaro Imaizumi
| Draw
| Zst: Zst 11
| 
| align=center| 2
| align=center| 5:00
| Tokyo, Japan
| 
|-
| Win
| align=center| 8-5-2
| Artemij Sitenkov
| Submission (Choke)
| Shooto Lithuania: Bushido
| 
| align=center| 1
| align=center| 2:29
| Vilnius, Lithuania
| 
|-
| Draw
| align=center| 7-5-2
| Kenichi Osawa
| Draw
| Zst: Zst 9
| 
| align=center| 3
| align=center| 3:00
| Tokyo, Japan
| 
|-
| Win
| align=center| 7-5-1
| Kit Kieu
| Submission (Armbar)
| Zst: Zst 8
| 
| align=center| 1
| align=center| 4:21
| Tokyo, Japan
| 
|-
| Win
| align=center| 6-5-1
| Sergej Juskevic
| Technical Submission (Omoplata)
| Zst: Battle Hazard 2
| 
| align=center| 1
| align=center| 2:51
| Tokyo, Japan
| 
|-
| Loss
| align=center| 5-5-1
| Hideo Tokoro
| Technical Submission (Guillotine Choke)
| Zst: Grand Prix 2 Opening Round
| 
| align=center| 1
| align=center| 0:38
| Tokyo, Japan
| 
|-
| Loss
| align=center| 5-4-1
| Marcos Galvao
| Decision (Unanimous)
| Shooto 2004: 1/24 in Korakuen Hall
| 
| align=center| 3
| align=center| 5:00
| Tokyo, Japan
| 
|-
| Win
| align=center| 5-3-1
| Eugenij Konkov
| Submission (Rear-Naked Choke)
| Shooto: Wanna Shooto 2003
| 
| align=center| 1
| align=center| 2:48
| Tokyo, Japan
| 
|-
| Loss
| align=center| 4-3-1
| Kentaro Imaizumi
| Decision (Unanimous)
| Shooto: 2/23 in Korakuen Hall
| 
| align=center| 3
| align=center| 5:00
| Tokyo, Japan
| 
|-
| Win
| align=center| 4-2-1
| Alfonso Alcarez
| Technical Submission (Triangle Choke)
| Shooto: Treasure Hunt 11
| 
| align=center| 2
| align=center| 3:04
| Tokyo, Japan
| 
|-
| Draw
| align=center| 3-2-1
| Kentaro Imaizumi
| Draw
| Shooto: Wanna Shooto 2002
| 
| align=center| 2
| align=center| 5:00
| Setagaya, Tokyo, Japan
| 
|-
| Win
| align=center| 3-2
| Ryan Diaz
| Decision (Unanimous)
| Shooto: Wanna Shooto 2001
| 
| align=center| 2
| align=center| 5:00
| Setagaya, Tokyo, Japan
| 
|-
| Loss
| align=center| 2-2
| Hiroaki Yoshioka
| Submission (Armbar)
| Shooto: R.E.A.D. 7
| 
| align=center| 2
| align=center| 3:43
| Setagaya, Tokyo, Japan
| 
|-
| Win
| align=center| 2-1
| Takeyasu Hirono
| TKO (Cut)
| Shooto: R.E.A.D. 4
| 
| align=center| 1
| align=center| 4:17
| Setagaya, Tokyo, Japan
| 
|-
| Loss
| align=center| 1-1
| Mamoru Yamaguchi
| Decision (Unanimous)
| Shooto: Renaxis 2
| 
| align=center| 2
| align=center| 5:00
| Tokyo, Japan
| 
|-
| Win
| align=center| 1-0
| Masaki Nishizawa
| Decision (Unanimous)
| Shooto: Gig '99
| 
| align=center| 2
| align=center| 5:00
| Tokyo, Japan
|

Championships and accomplishments

Mixed martial arts
Shooto
Shooto Featherweight Championship (1 time)
All Japan Amateur Shooto Featherweight Champion tournament winner (1998)
Submission wrestlingSamboCommand Sambo 60kg class champion (1997)

Professional wrestlingDDT Pro-WrestlingGWC 6-Man Tag Team Championship (2 times, current) – with Moehiko Harumisawa and Shu Sakurai (2)
Independent World Junior Heavyweight Championship (1 time)Theater Pro-WrestlingFūryūjin Tag Team Championship (1 time) – with Sho KarasawaVKF Pro-Wrestling'''
VKF King of Wrestle Naniwa Champion (1 time)

See also
List of male mixed martial artists

References

1976 births
Japanese male mixed martial artists
Japanese male professional wrestlers
Flyweight mixed martial artists
Bantamweight mixed martial artists
Featherweight mixed martial artists
Mixed martial artists utilizing wrestling
Living people
20th-century professional wrestlers
21st-century professional wrestlers
Independent World Junior Heavyweight Champions